Dorothy Henry (October 31, 1925 – December 21, 2020), born Dorothy Alice Leenknecht, was an American cartoonist and illustrator. She drew and wrote a newspaper comic strip, Bill and Sue, in London in the 1950s.

Early life and education 
Dorothy Leenknecht was born in Detroit, Michigan, the daughter of August Leenknecht and Dorothy Jean Waltham Leenknecht. She graduated from Cass Technical High School in 1943. She studied art at Wayne State University and the Detroit Institute of Arts, and with the Art Students League of New York. She earned an associate degree in art from St. Clair County Community College.

Career 
During World War II, Leenknecht was a member of the Civil Air Patrol. While she was a young wife and mother living in London in the 1950s, Dorothy Manning took over drawing and writing an existing comic strip, Bill and Sue, for the Daily Herald.

Back in Michigan, Dorothy Henry was staff illustrator at the Port Huron Times Herald. She was an active member of the Port Huron Hiking Club, the Blue Water Art Club, the Sarnia Rock and Fossil Club, and the Blue Water Lapidary Society. She was president of the board of trustees at the Port Huron Museum. In 1975, she had a one-woman show of her works, including comic strips, commercial illustrations, sketches and paintings, at the Port Huron Museum.

Personal life 
Dorothy Leenknecht married twice. Her first husband was Englishman Lawrence Sydney Rayson Manning; they married in 1951, and had two children, Jessie and Robert. Her second husband was electrical engineer  Howard Patrick Henry Jr. She died in 2020, aged 95 years.

References 

1925 births
2020 deaths
Artists from Detroit
People from Port Huron, Michigan
American women cartoonists
American women illustrators
Art Students League of New York alumni
People associated with the Detroit Institute of Arts
Wayne State University alumni
Cass Technical High School alumni
People of the Civil Air Patrol
American cartoonists
21st-century American women